This is a list of women artists who were born in Slovakia or whose artworks are closely associated with that country.

A
Sarah Avni (active since 2010), contemporary artist

B
Zuzana Rabina Bachorikova (born 1961), painter, designer
Mária Balážová (born 1956), contemporary artist

F
Jana Farmanová (born 1970), contemporary figurative painter

K
Lubica Kucerova (born 1983), fashion designer

L
Zuzana Licko (born 1961), Slovak-American typeface designer

P
Zora Palová (born 1947), glass artist

S
Petra Štefanková (born 1978), illustrator, designer, art director
Veronika Sramaty (born 1977), painter

-
Slovak
Artists
Artists, women